Arc of O (subtitled For Improvisers, Chamber Orchestra and Electronics) is an album by American jazz flautist Nicole Mitchell & an_Arche New Music Ensemble, a Polish chamber group co-founded and directed by Rafal Zapala and Filip Walcerz. It was recorded live as part of the Made in Chicago Festival of Poznań in 2010 and released on the French RogueArt label.

Reception

The Down Beat review by Michael Jackson says "One of Mitchell's assets, one might clain the mark of genius, is her ability to command and maintain, through composition, conduction and her own liquid flutework, fresh grooves one minute, complete abstraction the next."

The All About Jazz review by John Sharpe notes that "In the liners, the flutist explains that Arc of O has been a turning point, leading to further commissions bridging the jazz and contemporary worlds. If they are all as stimulating as this outing then perhaps they will generate their own terminology."

Track listing
All compositions by Nicole Mitchell
 "Arc of O" – 43:14
 "Afrika Rising" – 15:11

Personnel
Nicole Mitchell – flute, vocals, electronic samples, conduction
Renée Baker – violin 
Mwata Bowden – baritone sax, bass clarinet, clarinet
David Boykin – tenor sax
Rafal Zapala – electronics, percussion 
Krzysztof Dys – piano
Kuba Jankowiak – trumpet
Agnieszka Kowalczyk – cello 
Remigiuzz Strelczyk – viola
Pawel Szpura – drums
Rafal Gubanski – clarinet
Kuba Klepczynski – trombone
Lukasz Krzeminski – oboe
Maciej Strzelecki – violin
Kaswery Wojcinski – bass

References

2012 live albums
Nicole Mitchell (musician) live albums
RogueArt live albums